The Wisconsin–Platteville Pioneers football program is the intercollegiate American football team for the University of Wisconsin–Platteville located in the U.S. state of Wisconsin.

Notable players
 Dan Arnold
 Geep Chryst
 Mike Hintz

References

External links
 

 
American football teams established in 1895
1895 establishments in Wisconsin